Judge Simon may refer to:

Michael H. Simon (born 1956), judge of the United States District Court for the District of Oregon
Philip P. Simon (born 1962), judge of the United States District Court for the Northern District of Indiana

See also
Justice Simon (disambiguation)